John D. Thompson Jr. (December 17, 1928 – October 15, 1986) was a member of the Ohio House of Representatives. He was black and died of cancer, aged 57.

References

Democratic Party members of the Ohio House of Representatives
1928 births
1986 deaths
20th-century American politicians